Mansukh 
Mansukh is an Indian masculine given name derived from a Sanskrit word meaning "happy heart". Notable people of this name include:

Mansukh Bhuva, Indian politician
Mansukh L. Mandaviya (b. 1972), Indian politician
Mansukh C. Wani (d. 2020), Indian academic and organic chemist
Bhai Mansukh, Sikh, disciple of Guru Nanak

References

Indian masculine given names